Systerova is a rural locality (a village) in Yorgvinskoye Rural Settlement, Kudymkarsky District, Perm Krai, Russia. The population was 16 as of 2010.

Geography 
Systerova is located 16 km northeast of Kudymkar (the district's administrative centre) by road. Batina is the nearest rural locality.

References 

Rural localities in Kudymkarsky District